Michael Bolotin (born February 26, 1953), known professionally as Michael Bolton, is an American singer and songwriter. Bolton performed in the hard rock and heavy metal music genres from the mid-1970s to the mid-1980s, both on his early solo albums and those he recorded as the frontman of the band Blackjack. He became better known for his series of pop rock ballads, recorded after a stylistic change in the late 1980s.

Bolton has sold more than 75 million records, and recorded eight top 10 albums and two number-one singles on the Billboard charts, as well as winning six American Music Awards and two Grammy Awards. He has performed with artists including Lucia Aliberti, Patti LaBelle, José Carreras, Tony Cetinski, Ray Charles, Celine Dion, Plácido Domingo, Renée Fleming, Wynonna Judd, B.B. King, The Lonely Island, Luciano Pavarotti, Percy Sledge, and Zucchero.

Biography

Early life
Bolton was born in New Haven, Connecticut. His father, George Bolotin, was a local official in the Democratic Party, and his mother, Helen, was a homemaker. He has a brother, Orrin, and a sister, Sandra. By age 7, Bolton was able to play the saxophone. He began writing songs at age 9. At age 14, he formed a group, the Nomads, that were signed to a singles contract by Epic Records when Bolton was 16. With his parents' permission, he dropped out of high school and left home at age 15 to travel cross country along U.S. Route 66 and pursue music full-time. He took odd jobs, including as Paula Abdul’s babysitter.

Career

Music
Bolton began recording in 1975 at The Church Studio in Tulsa, Oklahoma. This first album was self-titled using his original family name of Bolotin. Early in his musical career, he focused on hard rock, with his band Blackjack once opening for heavy metal artist Ozzy Osbourne on tour. It was rumored that in 1983 Bolton auditioned for, but was denied, the lead vocalist position with Osbourne's former band, Black Sabbath. Bolton later stated this was untrue, saying "That rumor about me auditioning for Black Sabbath was only a rumor, I don't know how on earth it started."

After anglicizing his family name to Bolton, he gained his first major hit as a songwriter, co-writing "How Am I Supposed to Live Without You" for Laura Branigan, previously best known for singing the pop hit "Gloria". Narrowly missing the Top 10 on the US pop chart, Branigan took the song to number one on the Adult Contemporary chart for three weeks in 1983. The two sought to work with each other again, and their next collaboration was when Bolton co-wrote "I Found Someone" for Branigan in 1985. Her version was only a minor hit, but two years later, Cher resurrected the song, and with it her own singing career. Bolton co-wrote several other songs for both singers. Bolton recorded his own rendition of "How Am I Supposed to Live Without You" in 1988, which reached number one on the Hot 100.

Bolton achieved his greatest success in the late 1980s and early 1990s as a singer on the adult contemporary/easy listening charts. One of his first major hits was his 1987 interpretation of the Otis Redding classic "(Sittin' On) the Dock of the Bay". Redding's widow, Zelma Redding, said she was so moved by Bolton's performance "that it brought tears to my eyes. It reminded me so much of my husband that I know if he heard it, he would feel the same." Always interested in soul music and Motown classics, in 1989, Bolton released a cover version of "Georgia on My Mind" by Ray Charles, with which he had another hit. In 1991, Bolton released the album Time, Love & Tenderness which was made up entirely of cover versions, and featured his Grammy Award-winning cover version of "When a Man Loves a Woman", first recorded by Percy Sledge.

Bolton's last Top 40 single in the US was the 1997 hit "Go the Distance" (featured in the The Walt Disney Company animated motion picture Hercules), which peaked at No. 1 on the US adult contemporary chart. He hired conductor Larry Baird, the orchestral musical director, conductor, and arranger for The Moody Blues, Three Dog Night, and Al Jarreau, for his 2001 tour.

In 2006, Bolton and Nicollette Sheridan, his fiancée at the time, sang a duet, "The Second Time Around", for the album Bolton Swings Sinatra. In March 2007, Bolton toured South Africa for the first time. He was the headline act at Jacaranda 94.2 FM's two-day concert.

For Over the Rainbow, an album which was recorded in five days, Bolton recorded the song "New York, New York", which was also on his Bolton Swings Sinatra album. This was for an episode of the TV series, Challenge Anneka. The proceeds from the album went to children's hospices across the UK.

Bolton performed a duet entitled "Il Mio Amico" with the Italian singer Anna Tatangelo at the Sanremo Music Festival 2008. The song was originally sung by Tatangelo alone, but the duet version contained English lyrics as well.

Bolton's album Only a Woman Like You was released in 2001. The title song was co-written by Shania Twain.

Bolton released his album One World One Love in the UK on September 21, 2009. The first single, "Just One Love", was released one week earlier.

In May 2011, Bolton was featured as a guest vocalist in The Lonely Island's song "Jack Sparrow" on their Turtleneck & Chain album. His performance with the comedic hip-hop trio focused on his (intentionally) off-topic chorus and miscommunication with the group, and the video featured him dressed in costumes as Jack Sparrow from Pirates of the Caribbean, Forrest Gump, Erin Brockovich, and Tony Montana from Scarface.

In June 2011, Bolton collaborated with Indian musician A. R. Rahman for a song recorded for Gems – The Duets Collection.

In 2013, Bolton released the album Ain't No Mountain High Enough: A Tribute to Hitsville U.S.A., which featured duets with Kelly Rowland, Melanie Fiona and Orianthi.
 
In late 2013 and early 2014, Bolton appeared in Honda commercials in which he sings.

In 2015, Bolton sang on an episode of Last Week Tonight with John Oliver concerning the IRS.

Also in 2015, one of Bolton's songs with Blackjack, was sampled by Kanye West for his song "Never Let Me Down".

Bolton contributed "Upbeat Inspirational Song About Life" and its reprise to Teen Titans Go! To the Movies, which was released on July 27, 2018. He also voices the Tiger that sings the song in the film.

In 2021, Bolton guest-starred in season six of The Masked Singer where he sang Marvin Gaye & Tammi Terrell "Ain't No Mountain High Enough" with Faith Evans as "Skunk". In 2023, Bolton competed in season nine as "Wolf". After he was eliminated on "DC Superheroes Night", he took the time to promote his upcoming album and did an encore by performing "How Am I Supposed to Live Without You".

Bolton competed in the American Song Contest, representing Connecticut and performing the song Beautiful World, with his first performance in the first week, on March 21, 2022. Bolton made it to the finals, finishing in seventh place.

Acting
Bolton has made several cameo appearances in feature films and television, usually appearing as himself, such as in Meet Wally Sparks (1997), Two and a Half Men (2012), and The Nanny (1998). 

Although he has been rumored to have appeared as an extra in Dune (1984) as a "spice-eyed" drummer, Bolton has stated in interviews that it is not him.

In August 2006, Bolton was one of Lucy Lawless's duet partners on the Fox Broadcasting Company network's program Celebrity Duets, which Simon Cowell's Syco Productions Company produced for the network.

In September 2010, Bolton was a contestant on the 11th season of Dancing with the Stars. He and his dance partner Chelsie Hightower were the second couple to be eliminated, on September 28, 2010.

In 2015, Bolton starred in a Pizza Hut commercial as himself singing Jingle Bells while the family opens up their pizza order.

Directing
On May 15, 2018, American Dream: Detroit, a documentary produced by Bolton, premiered in the Redford Theatre. Bolton loves Detroit and wanted to highlight its economic comeback. The documentary features interviews with several business moguls, singers and other Detroit natives, including Christopher Ilitch, Jerry Bruckheimer, Francis Ford Coppola, Aretha Franklin, Smokey Robinson, and Alice Cooper.

Copyright infringement lawsuit by The Isley Brothers
On February 24, 1992, The Isley Brothers filed a lawsuit against Bolton, claiming his 1991 hit song "Love Is a Wonderful Thing" plagiarized their 1966 song of the same name. A Los Angeles jury ruled in favor of the Isley Brothers on April 25, 1994. The jury determined there were five instances in which Bolton's song plagiarized the Isleys' tune. Bolton, co-writer Andrew Goldmark, and Sony Publishing were ordered to turn over more than $5 million in profits from the sales of Bolton's version of the song to the Isley Brothers. It was the largest award in history for plagiarism in the music industry. Bolton, Goldmark and Sony appealed the verdict, and the court fight continued for nearly seven more years. The case concluded on January 22, 2001, when the Supreme Court of the United States refused to hear the appeal of a May 2000 decision by the United States Court of Appeals for the Ninth Circuit in San Francisco. Under the Ninth Circuit ruling, the Isleys were to be paid $4.2 million from Sony Music, $932,924 from Bolton, $220,785 from Goldmark, and the balance from Bolton and Goldmark's music publishing company.

A previous similar lawsuit, regarding his hit composition "How Am I Supposed to Live Without You" was settled in Bolton's favor, helped in part by testimony from the singer Laura Branigan.

Personal life
Bolton describes himself as a "rebel Jew". He was raised in a liberal interfaith family, describing his childhood home as decorated with both a Hanukkah menorah and a Christmas tree. His grandparents kept a kashrut household. He left Hebrew school at age 12 when his rabbi forbade him from returning unless he stopped joking around. Nevertheless, Bolton became bar mitzvah at age 13 and maintains some beliefs in Judaism.

Bolton has been a vegetarian since 1970.

In January 2013, Bolton published an autobiography, The Soul of It All: My Music, My Life.

Bolton lives in Westport, Connecticut.

Relationships and family
Bolton was married to Maureen McGuire from 1975 to 1990. They are the parents of three daughters, each born two years apart: Isa, Holly, and Taryn. He became a grandfather for the first time in October 2010, through his daughter Taryn. As of February 2019, he has six grandchildren, who range in age from 2 to 8.

Bolton was introduced to actress Nicollette Sheridan in 1992 by adult contemporary/jazz saxophonist Kenny G. Bolton and Sheridan dated until 1995, stopped dating, then reunited in 2005 and became engaged in March 2006; however, it was confirmed in August 2008 that they had broken off their engagement.

Philanthropy
In 1993, Bolton established The Michael Bolton Foundation, later renamed The Michael Bolton Charities, to assist women and children at risk from the effects of poverty as well as emotional, physical, and sexual abuse. In the late 1990s, the charity was heavily criticized for the incredibly low percentage of contributions that went towards charity work. In 1995 only 15% of the $2.6 million that the foundation raised went to charity, with most of the funds paying for a concert headlined by Bolton himself.

Bolton and the foundation have had a long running relationship with former Republican Connecticut Governor John G. Rowland, with Rowland steering state funding to the charity. In 1995, Bolton performed at a fundraiser for Rowland after the foundation received a grant of $300,000 from the state. In 2014, when Rowland was being sentenced for honest services fraud, mail fraud and tax fraud, Bolton wrote a letter to the judge overseeing Rowland's sentencing in support of Rowland. The foundation accepts grant proposals by invitation only.

Bolton also serves as the honorary chairman of Prevent Child Abuse America, the national chairman for This Close for Cancer Research, and a board member for the National Mentoring Partnership and the Joe DiMaggio Children's Hospital.

On July 25, 1993, Bolton played against Michael Jordan in a televised charity softball game at the Chicago White Sox stadium, Comiskey Park. Bolton's team, The Bolton Bombers, composed of Bolton and his band, won the game 7–1 against Jordan's team, Jordan's Air Force, which was composed of celebrities including Magic Johnson, Chris Chelios, Ahmad Rashad, Evander Holyfield, Daniel Baldwin, William Baldwin, Mark Harmon, MC Hammer, Tom Selleck and Stacey King, with Bo Jackson as coach.

In March 2003, Bolton joined with Lifetime Television, Verizon Wireless, and many others to lobby on behalf of the National Coalition Against Domestic Violence, urging legislation to provide more assistance for victims of domestic violence, such as affordable housing options.

Bolton has received the Lewis Hine Award from the National Child Labor Committee, the Martin Luther King Award from the Congress of Racial Equality, and the Ellis Island Medal of Honor from the National Ethnic Coalition of Organizations. The Hollywood Chamber of Commerce also recognized Bolton with a star on the Hollywood Walk of Fame for his musical and charitable contributions.

Discography

Since 1975, Bolton has released 24 studio albums and 35 singles. Nine of his singles have peaked at No. 1 on either the Billboard Hot 100 or the Hot Adult Contemporary Tracks charts in the US.

 Michael Bolotin (1975)
 Everyday of My Life (1976)
 Michael Bolton (1983)
 Everybody's Crazy (1985)
 The Hunger (1987)
 Soul Provider (1989)
 Time, Love & Tenderness (1991)
 Timeless: The Classics (1992)
 The One Thing (1993)
 This Is the Time: The Christmas Album (1996)
 All That Matters (1997)
 My Secret Passion (1998)
 Timeless: The Classics Vol. 2 (1999)
 Only a Woman Like You (2002)
 Vintage (2003)
 'Til the End of Forever (2005)
 Bolton Swings Sinatra (2006)
 One World One Love (2009)
 Gems: The Duets Collection / Duette (2011)
 Ain't No Mountain High Enough–Tribute to Hitsville (2013)
 Songs of Cinema (2017)
 A Symphony of Hits (2019)

Awards and nominations

Filmography

As actor
1997: Meet Wally Sparks
1998: The Nanny as himself 
2002: Snow Dogs (film also features four Michael Bolton songs)
2002: High Voltage
2008: The Onion Movie
2012/14: Two and a Half Men as himself (4 episodes)
2015: Glee as himself, episode ("The Rise and Fall of Sue Sylvester")
2016: Popstar: Never Stop Never Stopping
2017: Michael Bolton's Big, Sexy Valentine's Day Special
2017: Fresh Off the Boat as himself (3 episodes)
2018: Teen Titans Go! to the Movies as Tiger
2018: Little Big Awesome as himself (1 episode)
2023: The Masked Singer as The Wolf

As executive producer
2001: Offside (short)
2001: Good Advice
2005: Terror at Home: Domestic Violence in America (TV)
2008: The Other Side of the Tracks
2018: American Dream: Detroit

See also
 List of best selling music artists
 List of artists who reached number one on the Hot 100 (U.S.)

References

External links

 
 Michael Bolton Charities
 Michael Bolton 2006 interview at I Like Music
 

1953 births
20th-century American male singers
20th-century American musicians
20th-century American singers
21st-century American composers
21st-century American male singers
21st-century American singers
American male singer-songwriters
American people of Russian-Jewish descent
American pop rock singers
American soft rock musicians
American Song Contest contestants
American soul singers
American rock songwriters
Ballad musicians
Columbia Records artists
Concord Records artists
Grammy Award winners
Jewish rock musicians
Jewish singers
Jive Records artists
Living people
Musicians from New Haven, Connecticut
Participants in American reality television series
People involved in plagiarism controversies
Singer-songwriters from Connecticut
Singer-songwriters from New York (state)
Universal Motown Records artists